Howard Moore is an American college basketball coach and the former head men's basketball coach at University of Illinois at Chicago.  Moore replaced Jimmy Collins as head coach of the Flames on August 23, 2010. Moore most recently served as an assistant on head coach Greg Gard's staff at Wisconsin.

Moore played at Taft High School in the Chicago Public League and graduated from the University of Wisconsin. He began his coaching career with assisting the head boys basketball coach at Taft High School before coaching alongside Stewart (Stew) Robinson as his assistant head coach at UIC.

On the morning of Saturday, May 25, 2019, two members of his family: his wife, who died at a hospital, and his daughter, who died at the scene, were killed as the result of a collision with a vehicle that was being driven the wrong way. Assistant Coach Moore received serious injuries and was hospitalized, and his son received minor injuries. The driver of the vehicle going the wrong way was pronounced dead at the scene. Due to serious health concerns in the aftermath of the accident, Moore did not coach during the 2019–2020 nor in the 2020-21 season.

Head coaching record

References

External links
 UIC bio
 

Living people
American men's basketball coaches
Ball State Cardinals men's basketball coaches
Basketball coaches from Illinois
Basketball players from Chicago
Bradley Braves men's basketball coaches
Loyola Ramblers men's basketball coaches
Sportspeople from Chicago
UIC Flames men's basketball coaches
Wisconsin Badgers men's basketball coaches
Wisconsin Badgers men's basketball players
American men's basketball players
1970 births